Chaibi or Chaïbi is an Arabic surname, hailing from North Africa.

People with the surname 

 Ilyes Chaïbi (born 1996), French-Algerian footballer
 Leïla Chaibi (born 1982), French politician
 Tahar Chaïbi (1946–2014), Tunisian footballer

Surnames
Arabic-language surnames
Surnames of Algerian origin
Surnames of Tunisian origin